The Pseudocrenilabrinae are a subfamily in the cichlid family of fishes to which, according to a study from 2004, includes all the Middle Eastern and African cichlids with the exception of the unusual Heterochromis multidens and the Malagasy species. This subfamily includes more than 1,100 species. Previous authors recognized additional African subfamilies, e.g. the Tilapiinae of Hoedeman (1947), Tylochrominae of Poll (1986), or Boulengerochrominae of Tawil (2001).

To this subfamily belong the cichlids from the African Great Lakes, such as the utaka and mbuna in Lake Malawi, and various species from Lake Victoria and Lake Tanganyika.

The Pseudocrenilabrinae tribes Haplochromini and Oreochromini are widespread in Africa and also found in the Middle East, while Chromidotilapiini, Hemichromini and Tylochromini are primarily West and Central African. The remaining tribes are largely or entirely restricted to Lake Tanganyika.

Systematics
Apart from the tribes mentioned in the adjacent box, Bathybatini, Benthochromini, Boulengerochromini, Coelotilapiini, Coptodonini, Cyphotilapiini, Eretmodini, Etiini, Greenwoodochromini, Heterotilapiini, Limnochromini, Oreochromini, Pelmatolapiini, Perissodini, Steatocranini and Trematocarini are sometimes also recognized. The extinct genus Mahengechromis is apparently quite singular Pseudocrenilabrinae, distinct from any of the established tribes.

Genera 
The subfamily Pseudocrenilabrinae has been arranged as follows by some authorities
{|
|- valign=top
|
<div float="left">

 Bathybatini
 Bathybates Boulenger, 1898
 Hemibates Regan, 1920 
 Trematocara Boulenger, 1899 
 Benthochromini
 Benthochromis Poll, 1986
 Boulengerochromini
 Boulengerochromis Pellegrin, 1904
 Chromidotilapiini
 Benitochromis Lamboj 2001 
 Chromidotilapia Boulenger 1898
 Congochromis Stiassny & Schliewen, 2007
 Divandu Lamboj & Snoeks, 2000
 Limbochromis Greenwood, 1987 
 Nanochromis Pellegrin, 1904
 Parananochromis Greenwood, 1987
 Pelvicachromis Thys van den Audenaerde, 1968
 Teleogramma Boulenger, 1899
 Thysochromis Daget, 1988
 Wallaceochromis Lamboj, Trummer & Metscher, 2016 
 Coelotilapiini
 Coelotilapia Mayland, 1995
 Coptodonini
 Coptodon Gervais, 1848
 Cyphotilapiini
 Cyphotilapia Regan, 1920
 Cyprichromini
 Cyprichromis Scheuermann, 1977
 Paracyprichromis Poll, 1986
 Ectodini
 Aulonocranus Regan, 1920
 Callochromis Regan, 1920
 Cardiopharynx Poll, 1942
 Cunningtonia Boulenger, 1906
 Cyathopharynx Regan, 1920
 Ectodus Boulenger, 1898
 Grammatotria Boulenger, 1899
 Lestradea Poll, 1943
 Ophthalmotilapia Pellegrin, 1904
 Xenochromis Boulenger, 1899
 Xenotilapia Boulenger, 1899
 Eretmodini
 Eretmodus Boulenger, 1898
 Spathodus Boulenger, 1900
 Tanganicodus Poll, 1950
 Etiini
 Etia Schliewen & Stiassny, 2003
 Gobiocichlini
 Gobiocichla Kanazawa, 1951
 Greenwoodochromini 
 Greenwoodochromis Poll, 1983

 Haplochromini
 Abactochromis Oliver & Arnegard 2010 
 Alticorpus Stauffer & McKaye, 1988
 Aristochromis Trewavas, 1935
 Astatoreochromis Pellegrin, 1904
 Astatotilapia Pellegrin, 1904
 Aulonocara Regan, 1922
 Buccochromis Eccles & Trewavas, 1989
 Caprichromis Eccles, & Trewavas 1989
 Champsochromis Boulenger, 1915
 Cheilochromis Eccles & Trewavas 1989
 Chetia Trewavas, 1961
 Chilotilapia Boulenger, 1908
 Copadichromis Eccles & Trewavas, 1989
 Corematodus Boulenger, 1897
 Ctenochromis Pfeffer, 1893
 Ctenopharynx Eccles & Trewavas, 1989
 Cyathochromis Trewavas, 1935
 Cyclopharynx Poll, 1948
 Cynotilapia Regan, 1922
 Cyrtocara Boulenger, 1902
 Dimidiochromis Eccles & Trewavas, 1989
 Diplotaxodon Trewavas, 1935
 Docimodus Boulenger, 1897
 Eclectochromis Eccles & Trewavas, 1989
 Exochochromis Eccles & Trewavas, 1989
 Fossorochromis Eccles & Trewavas, 1989
 Genyochromis Trewavas, 1935
 Gephyrochromis Boulenger, 1901
 Haplochromis Hilgendorf, 1888
 Hemitaeniochromis Eccles & Trewavas, 1989
 Hemitilapia Boulenger, 1902
 Iodotropheus Oliver & Loiselle, 1972 
 Labeotropheus Ahl, 1926 
 Labidochromis Trewavas, 1935
 Lethrinops Regan, 1922
 Lichnochromis Trewavas, 1935
 Maylandia  M. K. Meyer & W. Förster, 1984
 Mbipia Lippitsch & Seehausen, 1998 
 Mchenga Stauffer & Konings, 2006
 Melanochromis Trewavas, 1935 
 Mylochromis Regan, 1920 
 Naevochromis Eccles & Trewavas, 1989
 Nimbochromis Eccles & Trewavas, 1989 
 Nyassachromis Eccles & Trewavas, 1989
 Orthochromis Greenwood, 1954
 Otopharynx Regan, 1920
 Pallidochromis Turner, 1994
 Petrotilapia Trewavas, 1935
 Pharyngochromis Greenwood, 1979
 Placidochromis Eccles & Trewavas, 1989
 Protomelas Eccles & Trewavas, 1989
 Pseudocrenilabrus Fowler, 1934
 Pseudotropheus Regan, 1922
 Rhamphochromis Regan, 1922
 Sargochromis Regan, 1920 
 Schwetzochromis Poll, 1948
 Sciaenochromis Eccles & Trewavas, 1989
 Serranochromis Regan, 1920
 Stigmatochromis Eccles & Trewavas, 1989
 Taeniochromis Eccles & Trewavas, 1989
 Taeniolethrinops Eccles & Trewavas, 1989
 Thoracochromis Greenwood, 1979 
 Tramitichromis Eccles & Trewavas 1989
 Trematocranus Trewavas 1935
 Trematochromis Poll, 1987
 Tropheops Trewavas, 1984  
 Tyrannochromis Eccles & Trewavas, 1989

 Hemichromini
 Anomalochromis Greenwood, 1985
 Hemichromis Peters, 1857
 Heterotilapiini
 Heterotilapia Regan, 1920
 Lamprologini
 Altolamprologus Poll, 1986 
 Chalinochromis Poll, 1974 (might belong in Julidochromis)
 Julidochromis Boulenger, 1898
 Lamprologus Schilthuis, 1891 
 Lepidiolamprologus Pellegrin, 1904  (probably polyphyletic)
 Neolamprologus Colombé & Allgayer, 1985 (polyphyletic?)
 Telmatochromis Boulenger, 1898  (probably polyphyletic)
 Variabilichromis Colombe & Allgayer, 1985
 Limnochromini
 Baileychromis Poll, 1986
 Gnathochromis Poll, 1981
 Limnochromis Regan, 1920
 Reganochromis Whitley, 1929
 Tangachromis Poll, 1981
 Triglachromis Poll & Thys van den Audenaerde, 1974
 Oreochromini
 Alcolapia Thys van den Audenaerde, 1969
 Danakilia Thys van den Audenaerde, 1969
 Iranocichla Coad, 1982
 Konia Trewavas, 1972
 Myaka Trewavas, 1972
 Oreochromis Günther, 1889
 Pungu Trewavas, 1972 
 Sarotherodon Rüppell, 1852
 Stomatepia Trewavas, 1962
 Tristramella Trewavas, 1942
 Pelmatochromini
 Pelmatochromis Steindachner, 1894
 PelmatolapiiniPelmatolapia Thys van den Audenaerde, 1969
 Perissodini
 Haplotaxodon Boulenger, 1906Perissodus Boulenger, 1898
 Plecodus Boulenger, 1898
 Steatocranini 
 Steatocranus Boulenger 1899
 Tilapiini
 Chilochromis Boulenger 1902
 Congolapia Dunz, Vreven  & Schliewen, 2012
 Pterochromis Trewavas, 1973
 Tilapia Smith, 1840 
 Tropheini
 Interochromis Yamaoka, M. Hori & Kuwamura, 1988 Limnotilapia Regan, 1920
 Lobochilotes Boulenger, 1915
 Petrochromis Boulenger, 1898
 Pseudosimochromis Nelissen, 1977 
 Simochromis Boulenger, 1898
 Tropheus Boulenger, 1898 
 Tylochromini
 Tylochromis Regan, 1920  

|}

 References 

Further reading
 I. P. Farias, G. Orti, A. Meyer: Total Evidence: Molecules, Morphology, and the Phylogenetics of Cichlid Fishes'', Journal of Experimental Zoology (Mol Dev Evol) 288:76–92 (2000)  PDF
 "Cichlidae". FishBase. Ed. Ranier Froese and Daniel Pauly. Nov 2006 version. N.p.: FishBase, 2006. 
 

 
Fish subfamilies
Taxa named by Henry Weed Fowler